María Jesús Pagés Madrigal (born 28 July 1963 in Seville, Spain), better known as María Pagés, is a modern Spanish dancer and choreographer and one of the most internationally renowned Flamenco artists in the world. She is considered the paramount representative of flamenco vanguard. Internationally acclaimed  for her personal aesthetic concept of this dance, she has proven to be the leading pioneer in the understanding of this art as an evolution, contemporary and alive, making her a leading innovator of modern flamenco. She founded her own dance company in 1990, now based in Madrid, Spain, while performing worldwide. In 2014 she was awarded with the Gold Medal of Merit in the Fine Arts (Spain) by the Spanish State through the Ministry of Culture.

Life and career
María Jesús Pagés Madrigal was born in Seville, Spain, and began dancing professionally with the Antonio Gades Company. She choreographed for films including Carmen, El Amor Brujo and Flamenco by Carlos Saura, and in 1990 she established the Maria Pagés Company. Her work is described as incorporating the national flamenco style with outside influences.

María Pagés and her company have toured internationally, appearing in the United States at the Baryshnikov Arts Center in New York City and The Kennedy Center in Washington, D.C., among other venues. In 1995 the expanded version of the Riverdance show included performance by the company to music of Irish style composed by Bill Whelan. In 2000 she provided choreography for the Hispanic Heritage Awards. Pagés serves on the board of the Cultural Council in Madrid.

Honors and awards
1996 - National Choreography Award
 Giraldillos Awards, Giennale of Arte Flamenco (four times)
2002 - National Dance Award
2004 - Leonid Massine Award, Italy
2005 - Flamenco Awards, VI Edition
2005 - Premios Flamenco Hoy, VI
2006 - Cultura Viva Award
2007 - Premio Cultura, Community of Madrid
2011 - International Award Terenci Moix
2011 - Medal of Andalucía
2014 - Gold Medal of Merit in the Fine Arts (Spain)
2022 - Princess of Asturias Award in the category "Arts".

Works

Selected works include:
Sol y sombra (1990)
De la luna al viento (1994)
Riverdance (1995-1996)
El perro andaluz, Burlerías (1996)
La tirana (1998)
Flamenco Republic (2001)
Ilusiones FM (2002)
Canciones, antes de una guerra (2004)
Sevilla (2006)
Autorretrato (2008)
Flamenco y Poesía (2008)
Dunas (2009)
Mirada (2010)	
Utopia (2011)
Yo, Carmen (2018)

Filmography

Pagés has appeared in television and films including:
Miradas 2 (TV series documentary) (2010–11)
A escena (TV series) (2010)
Ànima (TV series) (2009)
Plácido y la copla (TV movie) (2008)
La mandrágora (TV series)(2006)
The Late Late Show (TV series) (2003)
Riverdance: The New Show (1996)
Riverdance: The Show (1995)
Flamenco (1995)

References

External links

Official site

1963 births
Living people
Contemporary dance choreographers
Modern dancers
Spanish choreographers
Spanish female dancers